Hao kuih is a special snack originating in Shantou, Guangdong Province, China. It is known for its shape and flavor. First appearing in Chaoyang District in Shantou, Hao kuih is generally not well known beyond the Chaoshan community.

Kuih – Cake

Worship traditions in Chaoshan
Gods worship has a long history in Chanshan area. Unlike other superstitious activities, Chanshan natives more express their wishes for a better life. They make kuih by themselves for pleasing their gods in their worship traditions. Usually Chaoshan women will use rice flour, sweet potato flour and other materials to make snacks. In Chaoshan, this kind of snack is generally called kuih (粿). Sometimes it is similar to cakes in other places. There are many traditional activities of gods worship, in which kuih plays an important part.
Some researchers regard this way of worshiping gods as bribery. Natives use food to please their gods and hope gods can bless them. In Chaonan District in Shantou, many counties hold splendid festivals for gods, among which one is the most important for villagers. That is the day of showing their respect for all gods, and it is usually chosen in winter by the local. On that day, people will prepare a feast for all the gods and express their thanks to gods for all their bliss. A lot of food is prepared and after the ceremony people will distribute those tributes to their friends and relatives. A feast for gods finally ends up with a feast with friends and relatives.

A variety of kuih

Even though the ingredients are almost similar, there are many kinds of kuih with different shapes and colors: 
Tao kuih (红桃粿): Adding eatable red pigment, Tao kuih is a symbol of good luck.
Shuke kuih (鼠壳粿): With cudweed herb (鼠曲草) in it, it helps to relieve cough and reduce sputum.
Puzi kuih (朴子粿):  It is also called Hackberry Cake. Made of rice flour and Hack-berry leaves, it gives off fresh smell of the plant. Puzi kuih is green and usually shaped in special molds.
Shuijing kuih (水晶粿): Also called Crystal Ball, Shuijing kuih has a transparent appearance and thus we can see the fillings in it. Without any rice flour, it is totally made of sweet potato flour.
Radish kuih (菜头粿): Usually in winter, especially on Spring Festival, people make and eat Radish kuih which can make you feel warm.
Taro kuih (芋粿): Similar to Radish kuih, Taro cake is made of taro and flour.

Stories of hao kuih

Hao kuih first appeared in Ming or Qing Dynasty. A noble old woman was too old to chew, suffering from poor digestion and flatulence. At that time, people used the meat of limulus to make sauce which was delicious and good for digestion. Therefore, the old woman's daughter-in-law casually mixed the limulus sauce into flour and made cake with it. As a result, she made a kind of special kuih she called hao kuih. Kuih is soft and therefore it is suitable for the old woman. With limulus sauce in it, hao kuih improves her poor health condition. After that, hao kuih became famous in Chaoyang District in Shantou City. So far, hao kuih has been popular in Shantou as featured snack.  
Another story is about an official called Shi Bosheng. When he was in charge of a county where limulus destroyed local crops, he taught people to kill limulus and eat them. One way was to kill them for making hao kuih.

Limulus sauce
It was recorded by Duan Gonglu in Tang Dynasty that people at that time started eating limulus eggs. “子如麻子，堪为酱，即鲎子酱也.” Another scholar proved it in another historical book with the description that “腹中有子如绿豆，南人取之，碎其肉脚，和以为酱”, which means that people used limulus's olive-colored eggs to make sauce. Both of them gave evidence that limulus sauce has been for a long history.

"Hao" and limulus

Hao (Teochew dialect pronunciation) is limulus. Limulus is an ancient animal which has existed for a history and is called the “living fossil”. Therefore, the preservation of limulus is to protect species diversity. So far, Limulus in Chaoshan area has been under the protection since it was listed as the second category in endangered species.

In old days, Chaoshan people caught limulus and cooked them to make sauce, which is like caviar in western countries. Limulus sauce also has special medical function for digestion. However, limulus is also poisonous. After knowing its fatal poison and its decreasing number, people begin to stop killing limulus.

Today’s hao kuih
Hao kuih is originally made of limulus sauce and rice flour and with the filling of meat and vegetables. Since people stop killing limulus, they use some seafood like shrimp to replace it. So the hao kuih we eat today is different from the original one. But they pass down the traditional methods. The hao kuih also keep the shape of limulus only without the limulus sauce. People use barbecue sauce to improve its flavor. The Barbecue sauce in Chaoshan area is called Shacha sauce (沙茶酱). As a primary Chinese condiment, Shacha sauce is usually used in Fujian, Teochew and Taiwanese cuisine. It is made from many ingredients, including soybean oil, garlic, shallots, chilies, brill fish, dried shrimps. So it has a savory and slightly spicy taste.

The Process of Making hao kuih
  
Traditionally, people use local potato flour, rice and limulus sauce to make hao kuih.    
Cook porridge and then cool it down.  
Add potato flour, limulus sauce into it and then stir them evenly. 
Pour the ingredient mixture into the china molds.
Add some fresh shrimps and minced meat on the top and begin to cook them. 
 After they are done, take them out of the mold and fry them in oil.
When the hao kuih has a gold cover, it is the best time for taste.

See also
 Kuih 
 Limulus

References

Teochew cuisine
Rice cakes
Kue